Elena Filonova is a contemporary French classical pianist of Russian origin.

Biography 
After starting piano lessons at the age of three, she obtained the First Prize of the Concours Beethoven pour jeunes talents.

An adherent to the Heinrich Neuhaus school, Filonova had an international concert career after studying with Pavel Messner, Yevgeny Malinin, Kirill Kondrashin, Yevgeny Mravinsky and Emil Gilels.

She has recorded numerous records, including several for the Melodiya label (works by Chopin, Prokofiev, Sergei Rachmaninoff and Rodion Shchedrin).

Since 1990, Elena Filonova has been living in Paris.

In 2010, she founded her own Paris-based festival, "Harmonies d'Automne", for which she is the artistic director.

Selected discography 
 Works by Giovanni Bottesini, CD, with Rinat Ibragimov and the London Symphony Orchestra
 Tchaikovsky recitals, CD, Marcal Classics, 2004
 Mélodies oubliées — Arabesques, by Nikolai Medtner, CD, Ar re-se (distrib. Codaex), 2007

References

External links 
 Official website of Elena Filonova
 Elena Filonova
 Nikolai Medtner, Elena Filonova – Mélodies Oubliées on Discogs
 Master-class de la pianiste Elena Filonova (YouTube)

21st-century French women classical pianists
Date of birth missing (living people)
Living people
Year of birth missing (living people)
Place of birth missing (living people)